Johannes Veerman (born May 17, 1992) is an American professional golfer who plays on the European Tour and the Asian Tour. He claimed his breakthrough win on the European Tour at the D+D Real Czech Masters in 2021.

Professional career
Veerman turned professional in 2015. He played on the Asian Development Tour in 2016, achieving one victory at the Taifong Open. Later in the year, he finished tied-second at the Bank BRI-JCB Indonesia Open on the Asian Tour.

In 2017, Veerman finished second at the Yeangder Tournament Players Championship, one shot behind Ajeetesh Sandhu. In 2018, he recorded another runner-up finish at the Queen's Cup.

In 2019, Veerman earned a European Tour card for the 2020 season at the qualifying school. He recorded five top-10 finishes in his debut season; the best finish coming with a tied-for-fourth place at the Aphrodite Hills Cyprus Showdown. In 2021, he was contention to win at the Dubai Duty Free Irish Open, but late bogeys saw him ultimately finish in third place, four shots behind winner Lucas Herbert. This result however secured him a place in the 2021 Open Championship. A month later, Veerman won his first European Tour event at the D+D Real Czech Masters. He shot a final-round 68 to beat Sean Crocker and Tapio Pulkkanen by two shots.

Professional wins (2)

European Tour wins (1)

Asian Development Tour wins (1)

*Note: The 2016 Taifong Open was shortened to 54 holes due to weather.
1Co-sanctioned by the Taiwan PGA Tour

Results in major championships

CUT = missed the half-way cut
"T" = tied

See also
2019 European Tour Qualifying School graduates

References

External links
 
 
 

American male golfers
European Tour golfers
Asian Tour golfers
Golfers from California
Sportspeople from Orange County, California
1992 births
Living people